Sadomasochism is the giving and receiving of pleasure from acts involving the receipt or infliction of pain or humiliation. Practitioners of sadomasochism may seek sexual pleasure from their acts. While the terms sadist and masochist refer respectively to one who enjoys giving and receiving pain, some practitioners of sadomasochism may switch between activity and passivity.

The abbreviation S&M is commonly used for Sadomasochism (or Sadism & Masochism), although the initialisms S-M, SM, or S/M are also used, particularly by practitioners. Sadomasochism is not considered a clinical paraphilia unless such practices lead to clinically significant distress or impairment for a diagnosis. Similarly, sexual sadism within the context of mutual consent, generally known under the heading BDSM, is distinguished from non-consensual acts of sexual violence or aggression.

Definition and etymology 

The word sadomasochism is a portmanteau of the words sadism and masochism. The two words incorporated into this compound, "sadism" and "masochism", were originally derived from the names of two authors. The term "sadism" has its origin in the name of the Marquis de Sade (1740–1814), who not only practised sexual sadism, but also wrote novels about these practices, of which the best known is Justine. "Masochism" is named after Leopold von Sacher-Masoch (1836–1895), who wrote novels expressing his masochistic fantasies. These terms were first selected for identifying human behavioural phenomena and for the classification of psychological illnesses or deviant behaviour. The German psychiatrist Richard von Krafft-Ebing introduced the terms "Sadism" and "Masochism"' into medical terminology in his work Neue Forschungen auf dem Gebiet der Psychopathia sexualis ("New research in the area of Psychopathology of Sex") in 1890.

In 1905, Sigmund Freud described sadism and masochism in his Drei Abhandlungen zur Sexualtheorie ("Three papers on Sexual Theory") as stemming from aberrant psychological development from early childhood. He also laid the groundwork for the widely accepted medical perspective on the subject in the following decades. This led to the first compound usage of the terminology in Sado-Masochism (Loureiroian "Sado-Masochismus") by the Viennese Psychoanalyst Isidor Isaak Sadger in his work Über den sado-masochistischen Komplex ("Regarding the sadomasochistic complex") in 1913.

In the later 20th century, BDSM activists have protested against these ideas, because, they argue, they are based on the philosophies of the two psychiatrists, Freud and Krafft-Ebing, whose theories were built on the assumption of psychopathology and their observations of psychiatric patients. The DSM nomenclature referring to sexual psychopathology has been criticized as lacking scientific veracity, and advocates of sadomasochism have sought to separate themselves from psychiatric theory by the adoption of the term BDSM instead of the common psychological abbreviation, "S&M". However, the term BDSM also includes B&D (bondage and discipline), D/s (dominance and submission), and S&M (sadism and masochism). The terms bondage and discipline usually refer to the use of either physical or psychological restraint or punishment, and sometimes involves sexual role playing, including the use of costumes.

In contrast to frameworks seeking to explain sadomasochism through psychological, psychoanalytic, medical, or forensic approaches, which seek to categorize behavior and desires, and find a root cause, Romana Byrne suggests that such practices can be seen as examples of "aesthetic sexuality", in which a founding physiological or psychological impulse is irrelevant. Rather, according to Byrne, sadism and masochism may be practiced through choice and deliberation, driven by certain aesthetic goals tied to style, pleasure, and identity, which in certain circumstances, she claims can be compared with the creation of art.

Psychology

Historical perspective 

Sadomasochism, or the use of pain as a sexual stimulant has been practiced since ancient times with some scholars suggesting that it is an integral part of human culture. There are even those who propose that it is already present among nonhuman primate and primitive human communities before emerging in ancient cultures. One of the oldest surviving narratives that cited its practice was an Egyptian love song, sung by a man expressing a desire to be subjugated by a woman so he could experience pleasure as she treats him like a slave. The Roman historian Juvenal also described a case of a woman who submitted herself to the whipping and beating of the followers of Pan.

The modern conceptualization of sadomasochism stemmed from the terms sadism and masochism introduced to the medical field by German psychiatrist Richard von Krafft-Ebing in his 1886 compilation of case studies Psychopathia Sexualis. Pain and physical violence are not essential in Krafft-Ebing's conception, and he defined "masochism" (German Masochismus) entirely in terms of control. Sigmund Freud, a psychoanalyst and a contemporary of Krafft-Ebing, noted that both were often found in the same individuals, and combined the two into a single dichotomous entity known as "sadomasochism" (German Sadomasochismus, often abbreviated as S&M or S/M). This observation is commonly verified in both literature and practice; many practitioners, both sadists and masochists, define themselves as switches and "switchable" — capable of taking and deriving pleasure in either role. However, French philosopher Gilles Deleuze argued that the concurrence of sadism and masochism proposed in Freud's model is the result of "careless reasoning," and should not be taken for granted.

Freud introduced the terms "primary" and "secondary" masochism. Though this idea has come under a number of interpretations, in a primary masochism the masochist undergoes a complete, rather than partial, rejection by the model or courted object (or sadist), possibly involving the model taking a rival as a preferred mate. This complete rejection is related to the death drive (Todestrieb) in Freud's psychoanalysis. In a secondary masochism, by contrast, the masochist experiences a less serious, more feigned rejection and punishment by the model. Secondary masochism, in other words, is the relatively casual version, more akin to a charade, and most commentators are quick to point out its contrivedness.

Rejection is not desired by a primary masochist in quite the same sense as the feigned rejection occurring within a mutually consensual relationship—or even where the masochist happens to be the one having actual initiative power. In Things Hidden Since the Foundation of the World, René Girard attempts to resuscitate and reinterpret Freud's distinction of primary and secondary masochism, in connection with his own philosophy.

Both Krafft-Ebing and Freud assumed that sadism in men resulted from the distortion of the aggressive component of the male sexual instinct. Masochism in men, however, was seen as a more significant aberration, contrary to the nature of male sexuality. Freud doubted that masochism in men was ever a primary tendency, and speculated that it may exist only as a transformation of sadism. Sadomasochism in women received comparatively little discussion, as it was believed that it occurred primarily in men. Both also assumed that masochism was so inherent to female sexuality that it would be difficult to distinguish as a separate inclination.

Havelock Ellis, in Studies in the Psychology of Sex, argued that there is no clear distinction between the aspects of sadism and masochism, and that they may be regarded as complementary emotional states. He also made the important point that sadomasochism is concerned only with pain in regard to sexual pleasure, and not in regard to cruelty, as Freud had suggested. In other words, the sadomasochist generally desires that the pain be inflicted or received in love, not in abuse, for the pleasure of either one or both participants. This mutual pleasure may even be essential for the satisfaction of those involved.

Here, Ellis touches upon the often paradoxical nature of widely reported consensual S&M practices. It is described as not simply pain to initiate pleasure, but violence—"or the simulation of involuntary violent acts"—said to express love. This irony is highly evident in the observation by many, that not only are popularly practiced sadomasochistic activities usually performed at the express request of the masochist, but that it is often the designated masochist who may direct such activities, through subtle emotional cues perceived or mutually understood and consensually recognized by the designated sadist

In his essay Coldness and Cruelty, (originally Présentation de Sacher-Masoch, 1967) Gilles Deleuze rejects the term "sadomasochism" as artificial, especially in the context of the quintessentially modern masochistic work, Sacher-Masoch's Venus In Furs. Deleuze's counterargument is that the tendency toward masochism is based on intensified desire brought on or enhanced by the acting out of frustration at the delay of gratification. Taken to its extreme, an intolerably indefinite delay is 'rewarded' by punitive perpetual delay, manifested as unwavering coldness. The masochist derives pleasure from, as Deleuze puts it, the "Contract": the process by which he can control another individual and turn the individual into someone cold and callous. The sadist, in contrast, derives pleasure from the "Law": the unavoidable power that places one person below another. The sadist attempts to destroy the ego in an effort to unify the id and super-ego, in effect gratifying the most base desires the sadist can express while ignoring or completely suppressing the will of the ego, or of the conscience. Thus, Deleuze attempts to argue that masochism and sadism arise from such different impulses that the combination of the two terms is meaningless and misleading. A masochist's perception of their own self-subjugating sadistic desires and capacities are treated by Deleuze as reactions to prior experience of sadistic objectification. (For example, in terms of psychology, compulsively defensive appeasement of pathological guilt feelings as opposed to the volition of a strong free will.) The epilogue of Venus In Furs shows the character of Severin has become embittered by his experiment in the alleged control of masochism, and advocates instead the domination of women.

Before Deleuze, however, Sartre had presented his own theory of sadism and masochism, at which Deleuze's deconstructive argument, which took away the symmetry of the two roles, was probably directed. Because the pleasure or power in looking at the victim figures prominently in sadism and masochism, Sartre was able to link these phenomena to his famous philosophy of the "Look of the Other". Sartre argued that masochism is an attempt by the "For-itself" (consciousness) to reduce itself to nothing, becoming an object that is drowned out by the "abyss of the Other's subjectivity". By this Sartre means that, given that the "For-itself" desires to attain a point of view in which it is both subject and object, one possible strategy is to gather and intensify every feeling and posture in which the self appears as an object to be rejected, tested, and humiliated; and in this way the For-itself strives toward a point of view in which there is only one subjectivity in the relationship, which would be both that of the abuser and the abused. Conversely, Sartre held sadism to be the effort to annihilate the subjectivity of the victim. That means that the sadist is exhilarated by the emotional distress of the victim because they seek a subjectivity that views the victim as both subject and object.

This argument may appear stronger if it is understood that this "Look of the Other" theory is either only an aspect of the faculties of desire, or somehow its primary faculty. This does not account for the turn that Deleuze took for his own theory of these matters, but the premise of "desire as 'Look'" is associated with theoretical distinctions always detracted by Deleuze, in what he regarded as its essential error to recognize "desire as lack"—which he identified in the philosophical temperament of Plato, Socrates, and Lacan. For Deleuze, insofar as desire is a lack it is reducible to the "Look".

Finally, after Deleuze, René Girard included his account of sadomasochism in Things Hidden Since the Foundation of The World (1978), making the chapter on masochism a coherent part of his theory of mimetic desire. In this view of sadomasochism, the violence of the practices is an expression of a peripheral rivalry that has developed around the actual love-object. There is clearly a similarity to Deleuze, since both in the violence surrounding the memory of mimetic crisis and its avoidance, and in the resistance to affection that is focused on by Deleuze, there is an understanding of the value of the love object in terms of the processes of its valuation, acquisition and the test it imposes on the suitor.

Modern psychology 
There are a number of reasons commonly given for why a sadomasochist finds the practice of S&M enjoyable, and the answer is largely dependent on the individual. For some, taking on a role of compliance or helplessness offers a form of therapeutic escape; from the stresses of life, from responsibility, or from guilt. For others, being under the power of a strong, controlling presence may evoke the feelings of safety and protection associated with childhood. They likewise may derive satisfaction from earning the approval of that figure (see: Servitude (BDSM)). A sadist, on the other hand, may enjoy the feeling of power and authority that comes from playing the dominant role, or receive pleasure vicariously through the suffering of the masochist. It is poorly understood, though, what ultimately connects these emotional experiences to sexual gratification, or how that connection initially forms.
Dr. Joseph Merlino, author and psychiatry adviser to the New York Daily News, said in an interview that a sadomasochistic relationship, as long as it is consensual, is not a psychological problem:

It is usually agreed on by psychologists that experiences during early sexual development can have a profound effect on the character of sexuality later in life. Sadomasochistic desires, however, seem to form at a variety of ages. Some individuals report having had them before puberty, while others do not discover them until well into adulthood. According to one study, the majority of male sadomasochists (53%) developed their interest before the age of 15, while the majority of females (78%) developed their interest afterwards (Breslow, Evans, and Langley 1985). The prevalence of sadomasochism within the general population is unknown. Despite female sadists being less visible than males, some surveys have resulted in comparable amounts of sadistic fantasies between females and males. The results of such studies indicate that one's sex may not be the determining factor for a preference towards sadism.

Medical and forensic classification

Medical categorization

BDSM 
Medical opinion of sadomasochistic activities has changed over time. The classification of sadism and masochism in the Diagnostic and Statistical Manual of Mental Disorders (DSM) has always been separate; sadism was included in the DSM-I in 1952, while masochism was added in the DSM-II in 1968. Contemporary psychology continues to identify sadism and masochism separately, and categorizes them as either practised as a life style, or as a medical condition.

The current version of the American Psychiatric Association's manual, DSM-5, excludes consensual BDSM from diagnosis as a disorder when the sexual interests cause no harm or distress.

Sexual sadism disorder however, listed within the DSM-5, is where arousal patterns involving consenting and non‐consenting others are not distinguished.

ICD 
On 18 June 2018, the WHO (World Health Organization) published ICD-11, and Sadomasochism, together with Fetishism and Transvestic Fetishism, are now removed as psychiatric diagnoses. Moreover, discrimination of fetish- and BDSM individuals is considered inconsistent with human rights principles endorsed by the United Nations and The World Health Organization.

The classifications of sexual disorders reflect contemporary sexual norms and have moved from a model of pathologization or criminalization of non-reproductive sexual behaviors to a model which reflects sexual well-being and pathologizes the absence or limitation of consent in sexual relations.

The ICD-11 classification, contrary to ICD-10 and DSM-5, clearly distinguishes consensual sadomasochistic behaviours (BDSM) that do not involve inherent harm to self or others, from harmful violence on non‐consenting persons (Coercive sexual sadism disorder).

In this regard, "ICD-11 go further than the changes made for DSM-5 … in the removal of disorders diagnosed based on consenting behaviors that are not in and of themselves associated with distress or functional impairment."

In Europe, an organization called ReviseF65 has worked to remove sadomasochism from the ICD. On commission from the WHO ICD-11 Working Group on Sexual Disorders and Sexual Health, ReviseF65 in 2009 and 2011 delivered reports documenting that sadomasochism and sexual violence are two different phenomena. The report concluded that the sadomasochism diagnosis was outdated, non-scientific, and stigmatizing. In 1995, Denmark became the first European Union country to have completely removed sadomasochism from its national classification of diseases. This was followed by Sweden in 2009, Norway in 2010, Finland in 2011 and Iceland in 2015.

"Based on advances in research and clinical practice, and major shifts in social attitudes and in relevant policies, laws, and human rights standards", the World Health Organization (18 June 2018) removed Fetishism, Transvestic Fetishism and Sadomasochism as psychiatric diagnoses.

The ICD-11 classification consider Sadomasochism as a variant in sexual arousal and private behavior without appreciable public health impact and for which treatment is neither indicated nor sought."

Further the ICD-11 guidelines "respect the rights of individuals whose atypical sexual behavior is consensual and not harmful."

WHO's ICD-11 Working Group admits that psychiatric diagnoses have been used to harass, silence, or imprison sadomasochists. Labeling them as such may create harm, convey social judgment, and exacerbate existing stigma and violence to individuals so labeled.

According to ICD-11, psychiatric diagnoses can no longer be used to discriminate against BDSM people and fetishists.

Recent surveys on the spread of BDSM fantasies and practices show strong variations in the range of their results. Nonetheless, researchers assume that 5 to 25 percent of the population practices sexual behavior related to pain or dominance and submission. The population with related fantasies is believed to be even larger.

Forensic classification 

According to Anil Aggrawal, in forensic science, levels of sexual sadism and masochism are classified as follows:

Sexual masochists:
 Class I: Bothered by, but not seeking out, fantasies. May be preponderantly sadists with minimal masochistic tendencies or non-sadomasochistic with minimal masochistic tendencies
 Class II: Equal mix of sadistic and masochistic tendencies. Like to receive pain but also like to be dominant partner (in this case, sadists). Sexual orgasm is achieved without pain or humiliation.
 Class III: Masochists with minimal to no sadistic tendencies. Preference for pain or humiliation (which facilitates orgasm), but not necessary to orgasm. Capable of romantic attachment.
 Class IV: Exclusive masochists (i.e. cannot form typical romantic relationships, cannot achieve orgasm without pain or humiliation).

Sexual sadists:
 Class I: Bothered by sexual fantasies but do not act on them.
 Class II: Act on sadistic urges with consenting sexual partners (masochists or otherwise). Categorization as leptosadism is outdated.
 Class III: Act on sadistic urges with non-consenting victims, but do not seriously injure or kill. May coincide with sadistic rapists.
 Class IV: Only act with non-consenting victims and will seriously injure or kill them.

The difference between I–II and III–IV is consent.

BDSM 

The term BDSM is commonly used to describe consensual activities that contain sadistic and masochistic elements. Masochists tend to be very specific about the types of pain they enjoy, preferring some and disliking others. Many behaviors such as spanking, tickling, and love-bites contain elements of sadomasochism. Even if both parties legally consent to such acts this may not be accepted as a defense against criminal charges. Very few jurisdictions will permit consent as a legitimate defense if serious bodily injuries are caused. It has been argued that in many countries, the law disregards the sexual nature of sadomasochism - or the fact that participants enter these relationships voluntarily because they enjoy the experience. Instead, the criminal justice system focuses on what it views as dangerous or violent behavior. What this essentially means is that instead of attempting to understand and accommodate for voluntary sadomasochism, the law typically views these incidences as cases of assault. This can be seen with the well-known case in Great Britain, where 15 men were trialed for a range of offences relating to sadomasochism. Samois, the earliest known lesbian S/M organization in the United States, was founded in San Francisco in 1978.

Harsh acts of S&M may include consensual torture of the sensitive parts of body, such as cock and ball torture for males, and breast torture and pussy torture for females. Acts common for both genders may include ass torture (ex. using speculum), face torture (ex. nose torture), etc. In extreme cases, sadism and masochism can include fantasies, sexual urges or behavior which cause observably significant distress or impairment in social, occupational, or other important areas of functioning, to the point that they can be considered part of a mental disorder. However, this is widely considered to be rare, as psychiatrists now regard such behaviors as clinically aberrant only if they are identifiable as symptoms or associated with other problems such as personality disorder or neurosis. There is some controversy in the psychology professions regarding a personality disorder referred to alternately as "self-defeating personality disorder" or "masochistic personality disorder", where masochistic behavior may not be in relation to other diagnosed mental disease. Ernulf and Innala (1995) observed discussions among individuals with such interests, one of whom described the goal of hyperdominance.

The Fifty Shades trilogy is a series of very popular erotic romance novels by E. L. James which involve S/M. These have been criticized for their inaccurate and harmful depiction of S/M. Their film adaptations have been similarly criticized.

Other
A table in Larry Townsend's The Leatherman's Handbook II (the 1983 second edition; the 1972 first edition did not include this list) which is generally considered authoritative states that a black handkerchief is a symbol for sadomasochism in the handkerchief code, which is employed usually among gay male casual-sex seekers or BDSM practitioners in the United States, Canada, Australia and Europe. Wearing the handkerchief on the left indicates the top, dominant, or active partner; right the bottom, submissive, or passive partner. However, negotiation with a prospective partner remains important because, as Townsend noted, people may wear hankies of any color "only because the idea of the hankie turns them on" or "may not even know what it means".

See also 

 Algolagnia
 Cuckoldry
 Discipline (BDSM)
 Domination & submission (BDSM)
 Edgeplay
 Erotic humiliation
 Master/slave (BDSM)
 Paraphilia
 Sadism and masochism in fiction
 Safeword
 Schadenfreude
 Suspension piercing
 Vulnerability and care theory of love

References

Citations

Bibliography

Further reading 
 Falaky, Faycal (2014). Social Contract, Masochist Contract: Aesthetics of Freedom and Submission in Rousseau. Albany: State University of New York Press. 
 Newmahr, Staci (2011). Playing on the Edge: Sadomasochism, Risk and Intimacy. Bloomington: Indiana University Press. .
 Phillips, Anita (1998). A Defense of Masochism. .
 Odd Reiersol, Svein Skeid:The ICD Diagnoses of Fetishism and Sadomasochism, in Journal of Homosexuality, Harrigton Park Press, Vol.50, No.2/3, 2006, pp. 243–262
 Saez, Fernando y Olga Viñuales, Armarios de Cuero, Editorial Bellaterra, 2007. 
 
 Weinberg, Thomas S., "Sadomasochism in the United States: A Review of Recent Sociological Literature", The Journal of Sex Research 23 (Feb. 1987) 50-69

External links 

 "Pain and the erotic" by Lesley Hall

Videos 
 "Ms. Servalan Cane Class @ DomConLA taken by Mistress Ellen"
 "50 Shades of Fringe. Blade & whip demo."
 "Piercing and Fire Show @ Tattoo Messe Frankfurt 20 03 2015"
 "BDSM Board Game"

Sadism and Masochism
Cruelty
Personality disorders
Psychiatric research